"Wait in the Truck" (stylized in all lowercase) is a song by American country music singer Hardy featuring American country music singer Lainey Wilson. It was released on August 29, 2022, as the lead single from Hardy's second studio album The Mockingbird & the Crow. The song is a murder ballad about a male protagonist killing an abuser.

Background and content
The idea for the song came from a conversation between two of its songwriters, Hardy and Hunter Phelps.  When discussing what they would do if their fiancées were attacked, Hardy mentioned he would direct the attacker towards himself and then tell his fiancée to "wait in the truck". The pair then realized that "wait in the truck" was a good song title. In March 2021, they worked up the song at Jordan Schmidt's home studio, taking inspiration from the song "Ol' Red". They recorded a demo that night, with Schmidt adding an artificial siren to the end of the third verse, and his fiancée, singer-songwriter Renee Blair, providing the female vocals and adding a vamp of the phrase "have mercy". Producer Joey Moi would later rerecord the primary instrumentation and add a gospel choir for the closing vamp.

Wilson cited Garth Brooks' "The Thunder Rolls" and The Chicks' "Goodbye Earl" as inspiration for her performance, and said she hoped the song "brings light to a situation that is more common than we’d like to admit" and "haunts" domestic abusers.

The song depicts a man who, upon finding a battered woman on the side of the road, confronts her abuser in his trailer, shooting him when he reaches for his shotgun, killing the abuser. The song ends with the man in prison, 60 months into a sentence.

Music video 
A music video was released with the song, directed by Justin Clough and produced by Taylor Vermillion and Ben Skipworth. The video follows the song, depicting a character played by Hardy killing the abuser of a character played by Wilson, as well as scenes of Wilson's character testifying in court and visiting Hardy in prison. The video was described as "Video of the Year-worthy" by Madeleine O'Connell, writing for Country Now.

Charts

Weekly charts

Year-end charts

References

2022 singles
2022 songs
Hardy (singer) songs
Lainey Wilson songs
Songs written by Hardy (singer)
Songs written by Jordan Schmidt
Song recordings produced by Joey Moi
Big Loud singles
Murder ballads
Male–female vocal duets
Songs about domestic violence